Pelagimonas is a Gram-negative, heterotrophic and aerobic genus of bacteria from the family of Rhodobacteraceae with one known species (Pelagimonas varians). Pelagimonas varians has been isolated from seawater from the North Sea in Germany.

References

Rhodobacteraceae
Bacteria genera
Monotypic bacteria genera